WYGG (88.1 FM, "Radio Bonne Nouvelle") is a radio station licensed to serve Asbury Park, New Jersey.  The station is owned by Minority Business & Housing Development, Inc.  It airs a religious radio format. The station's nickname translates to "Good News Radio" in English.

The station was assigned the WYGG call letters by the Federal Communications Commission on March 4, 1994.

Programming
WYGG serves the Haitian-American community of Asbury Park and the greater New York City area with religious, community involvement, and information programming. The station broadcasts in French, English, and Creole.

Journalist Maureen Nevin created and has hosted a weekly public affairs talk show called "Asbury Radio — The Radio Voice of Asbury Park" for more than six years, during which time the show reported on the redevelopment of the city's waterfront. In November 2006, the FCC ordered the 100-watt station off the air for radiation signing violations it cited in a December 20, 2007 letter, and fined the station $25,000. The station resumed in February 2007 and gained approval to broadcast at 1500 watts. However, Asbury Radio did not return to the air.

Ownership
In December 1998, Minority Business and Housing Development Inc. (Abner Louima, president), reached an agreement to purchase WYGG from Evangelical Crusade of Fishers of Men, Inc., for $1. United Press International characterized this as "a financial formality for what amounts to a gift." The FCC approved the transfer to MBHD in May 2000.

References

External links
WYGG official website

Asbury Radio's official website

Asbury Park, New Jersey
YGG
French-language mass media in the United States
French-language radio stations
Haitian Creole-language mass media
Haitian-American culture in New Jersey
Radio stations established in 1994
1994 establishments in New Jersey
YGG